The 1986 Southwestern Louisiana Ragin' Cajuns football team was an American football team that represented the University of Southwestern Louisiana (now known as the University of Louisiana at Lafayette) as an independent during the 1986 NCAA Division I-A football season. In their first year under head coach Nelson Stokley, the team compiled a 6–5 record.

Schedule

References

Southwestern Louisiana
Louisiana Ragin' Cajuns football seasons
Southwestern Louisiana Ragin' Cajuns football